Douglas Alan Schuck Friedrich (born 7 November 1988), known as Douglas Friedrich or simply Douglas, is a Brazilian professional footballer who plays as a goalkeeper for Saudi Arabian club Al-Khaleej.

Club career

Bahia
On 9 January 2018, Friedrich signed a contract until 2020 with Bahia as part of Juninho Capixaba's transfer to Corinthians.

Al-Khaleej
On 12 July 2022, Friedrich joined Saudi Arabian club Al-Khaleej.

Personal life
He is the older brother of Ricardo, also a goalkeeper.

Career statistics

Honours
Bahia
Campeonato Baiano: 2018, 2019, 2020
Copa do Nordeste: 2021

References

External links

1998 births
Living people
Brazilian people of German descent
Brazilian footballers
Association football goalkeepers
Campeonato Brasileiro Série A players
Campeonato Brasileiro Série B players
Campeonato Brasileiro Série C players
Saudi Professional League players
Capivariano Futebol Clube players
Ituano FC players
Sociedade Esportiva e Recreativa Caxias do Sul players
Clube Atlético Bragantino players
Sport Club Corinthians Paulista players
Grêmio Foot-Ball Porto Alegrense players
Avaí FC players
Esporte Clube Bahia players
Esporte Clube Juventude players
Khaleej FC players
Brazilian expatriate footballers
Brazilian expatriate sportspeople in Saudi Arabia
Expatriate footballers in Saudi Arabia